Super DX-Ball is a shareware game by BlitWise Productions, released on November 10, 2004. It is an enhanced remake to the classic brick-buster hit DX-Ball. Among new features since previous games, Super DX-Ball introduces refined, classic-style graphics (as a tribute to the original game) and a new dimension of bricks with various shapes and sizes (originally inspired from Rival Ball Tournament), adding a unique gameplay experience in a Breakout-style game.

Gameplay
As a common concept of Breakout clone, the objective of the game is to clear all the bricks on the screen in order to advance to the next board. The player controls a paddle at the bottom of the screen by using the mouse or keyboard, keeping one or more balls by deflecting them into a field of bricks on the screen without missing the only ball in play. Some bricks may appear to be solid, take multiple hits to clear, invisible, or explosive. As bricks are being cleared, a random power-up will occasionally released onto the screen. The player may choose to catch these with the paddle, or avoid them depending on the effect whether it is positive, neutral or negative. Negative power-ups usually increases the difficulty, while neutral may vary depending on the situation. The power-ups of Super DX-Ball are direct clones from previous games, with several minor alterations (e.g. when the player gets a "Fast Ball", the ball now will only speed up slightly instead of accelerating to full speed, and the "Extra Life" were no longer remove the paddle enhancements).

Similar to previous installments, if only one brick remain on the board and taking too long to hit it, the brick will be destroyed by a lightning bolt.

A unique element of the game is when the ball gets stuck between the unbreakable bricks for too long, the ball transforms into a "gold ball" and can clear any bricks in one hit, unlike in previous games where unbreakable bricks are transformed into regular ones when the ball is stuck for a certain amount of time.

Development
Programmed by Michael P. Welch in 2004, Super DX-Ball was considered to be indirect sequel and as a tribute to the original game, rather than a follow-up to Rival Ball. Unlike its predecessors, the graphics were designed to retain the classic style, recycling the graphics for the bricks and power-ups, a pure black background, but with an updated texture for the paddle (vaguely resembling the "Vaus" from Arkanoid). However, these graphics are greatly refined with a high-colour 32-bit 2D engine, giving a more smoother look and solid colours.

The key aspect of Super DX-Ball is the introduction of geometric bricks with various shapes and sizes that creates an artistic board design and eye-catching patterns, adding a unique gameplay experience of a Breakout clone. Most of these new board designs are usually based on abstract art and mosaics, though several others form simple pictures and clip-arts. While the freeware version only offer 27 of these boards, the full pack of 90 other boards are only available in the registered version.

Aside from the newly designed geometric boards, the game also offer the classic gameplay experience with regular rectangular bricks, by introducing several classic-style boards that paid tribute to the original game, including the original boards from DX-Ball. There are a total of 145 classic boards, with only 70 of them are made available in the freeware version.

Board packs
The freeware version comes with six different board packs: Classic, Super, Challenge (demo), Surprise (demo), Fun (demo), and Retro (demo), and features a total of 97 boards. The game also features a tribute to MegaBall 3 for the Amiga, including a hidden MegaBall board pack, which contains the 20 boards from the original game. This easter egg can be discovered by clicking on the Mega Ball power-up icon on the title screen. Notably, the Classic board pack (which contains all 50 boards from the original DX-Ball) also used to be an easter egg, prior to version 1.1, in which it could be obtained by clicking the grey Amiga Boing Ball icon on the title screen, between the words "DX" and "BALL".

The registered version of the game, referred to as Super DX-Ball Deluxe, features a total of 245 boards, expanding the demo board packs to their entirety of 30 boards each for Challenge, Surprise, and Fun, and 75 boards for Retro. It also adds support for additional board expansion packs, of which there are two available, as of June, 2012:

Bonus Pack:    15 new levels (Free)
Treasure Pack: 10 new levels (Free)

Trivially, there is a secret message encoded (via binary code) into the final level of Treasure Pack, which reads "DX-BALL 1996 TO 2006 AND STILL THE BEST)".

References

External links
BlitWise Productions

2004 video games
Breakout clones
Video games developed in the United States
Windows games
MacOS games